Events from the year 1813 in Scotland.

Incumbents

Law officers 
 Lord Advocate – Archibald Colquhoun
 Solicitor General for Scotland – David Monypenny; then Alexander Maconochie

Judiciary 
 Lord President of the Court of Session – Lord Granton
 Lord Justice General – The Duke of Montrose
 Lord Justice Clerk – Lord Boyle

Events 
 1 April – whaler Oscar wrecked off Aberdeen with the loss of 44 lives.
 15 April – foundation stone of new harbour at Newhaven, Edinburgh, laid.
 October
 Completion of road bridge at Potarch by Thomas Telford; his bridge at Invermoriston is also completed this year.
 Probable completion of cast-iron footbridge over Esk on Buccleuch estate near Langholm.
 The first Kirkcaldy whaler, The Earl Percy, sails north to the Davis Strait.
 Glasgow weavers fail in an attempt to secure higher wages.
 Robert Owen obtains control of the cotton spinning mills at New Lanark and publishes A New View of Society, or Essays on the Principle of the Formation of the Human Character.

Births 
 30 January – George Gilfillan, writer and poet (died 1878)
 18 March –
 Thomas Graham Balfour, physician (died 1891 in London)
 William Calder Marshall, sculptor (died 1894 in London)
 19 March – David Livingstone, missionary and explorer (died 1873 in Africa)
 13 April – Duncan Farquharson Gregory, mathematician (died 1844)
 14 May (bapt.) – John Hosack, lawyer and historian (died 1887 in London)
 17 May? – Eliza Rennie, author
 18 May – Colin Blackburn, Baron Blackburn, judge (died 1896)
 21 May – Robert Murray M'Cheyne, clergyman (died 1843)
 27 May – William McNaught, steam engineer (died 1881 in Manchester)
 21 June – William Edmondstoune Aytoun, lawyer and poet (died 1865)
 28 July – James Newlands, municipal engineer (died 1871 in Liverpool)
 10 August – Archibald Smith, mathematician and lawyer (died 1872 in London)
 6 September – Edward Balfour, surgeon and orientalist (died 1889 in London)
 10 September – Angus MacKay, piper (died 1859)
 13 September – Daniel MacMillan, publisher (died 1857)
 30 September – John Rae, Arctic explorer and physician (died 1893 in London)
 November – John Stuart, genealogist (died 1877)
 13 December –
 James R. Ballantyne, orientalist (died 1864)
 David Brandon, architect (died 1897)
 George Bryson Sr., businessman and politician in Quebec (died 1900 in Canada)
 18 December – John Edgar Gregan, architect (died 1855 in Manchester)
 John Bell-Irving, businessman in Hong Kong (died 1907)
 James Colquhoun Campbell, Bishop of Bangor (died 1895 in Hastings)
 Benjamin Connor, steam locomotive designer (died 1876)
 Anthony Inglis, shipbuilder (died 1884)
 John Kennedy, Congregational minister and theologian (died 1900)
 William Logan, temperance campaigner (died 1879)
 Letitia MacTavish Hargrave, born Letitia MacTavish, pioneer in Canada (died 1854)
 Daniel M'Naghten, assassin (died 1865 in Broadmoor Criminal Lunatic Asylum)
 George Tosh, metallurgist (died 1900 in Scunthorpe)

Deaths 
 5 January – Alexander Fraser Tytler, judge and historian (born 1747)
 15 February – Francis Home, physician (born 1719)
 15 March – Janet Richmond, born Janet Little, "The Scots Milkmaid", Scots language poet (born 1759)
 15 April – Alexander Murray, linguist (born 1775)
 22 June – Allan Burns, surgeon (born 1781)
 8 July – William Craig, Lord Craig, judge (born 1745)
 23 August – Alexander Wilson, ornithologist in America (born 1766)
 11 October – Robert Kerr, scientific writer and translator (born 1755)
 28 October – William Dudgeon, farmer and songwriter (born 1753?)

The arts
James Hogg's poem The Queen's Wake is published.

See also 
 Timeline of Scottish history
 1813 in the United Kingdom

References 

 
Scotland
Years of the 19th century in Scotland
1810s in Scotland